Staré Město pod Landštejnem is a market town in Jindřichův Hradec District in the South Bohemian Region of the Czech Republic. It has about 500 inhabitants.

Administrative parts

Villages and hamlets of Dobrotín, Landštejn, Návary, Podlesí, Pomezí, Veclov and Vitíněves are administrative parts of Staré Město pod Landštejnem.

Geography
The municipal territory borders with Austria and is adjacent to the municipality of Kautzen. It is situated in the Javořice Highlands. The Pstruhovec stream flows through the market town.

Sights
The main landmark is the Landštejn Castle.

Twin towns – sister cities

Staré Město pod Landštejnem is twinned with:
 Rača (Bratislava), Slovakia

References

External links

Populated places in Jindřichův Hradec District
Market towns in the Czech Republic